Antoni Madaliński (1739–1805) – Polish Lieutenant General, commander of 1st Greater Polish National Cavalry Brigade during Kościuszko Uprising.

He was Bar Confederation participant. In 1786 was elected deputy and soon after deputy on Great Sejm. He participated in Polish–Russian War of 1792. On March 12, 1794, he decided to disobey the order to demobilise his unit, advancing his troops from Ostrołęka to Kraków, even attacking Prussian army posts along a Polish border. This sparked an outbreak of riots against Russian forces throughout the country. The Russian garrison of Kraków was ordered to leave the city and attack the Polish forces. This left the city completely undefended. He fought in battle of Racławice and Szczekociny. His formation has assured the expedition of Polish forces commanded by General Jan Henryk Dąbrowski to Wielkopolska. After capitulation, he was jailed by the Prussians from 1795–1797.

Bibliography

 Marian Lech Generał Antoni Madaliński 
 Wacław Tokarz, Marsz Madalińskiego, in: Rozprawy i szkice. Militaria, vol. II, Warszawa 1959

External links
 Advancing of Madaliński cavalry brigade from Ostrołęka to Kraków. 1794

1739 births
1805 deaths
People from Sieradz County
Generals of the Polish–Lithuanian Commonwealth
Generals of the Kościuszko Uprising
Kościuszko insurgents
Bar confederates
People of the Polish–Russian War of 1792